FC Flora U21 is an Estonian football team based in Tallinn, Estonia.

It is the reserve team of Flora, and currently plays in Esiliiga. Reserve teams in Estonia play in the same league system as the senior team, rather than in a reserve team league. They must play at least one level below their main side.

Players

First-team squad

Reserves and academy

Personnel

Current technical staff

Managerial history

Honours

League
 Esiliiga
 Winners (2): 2014, 2015

References

External links
Official website

FC Flora
Flora U21
Association football clubs established in 2006
2006 establishments in Estonia